Victoria "Vicki" Vale is a fictional character from Tim Burton's 1989 superhero film Batman, portrayed by Kim Basinger and based on the DC Comics character of the same name.

Character arc
When the film begins, photojournalist Vicki Vale has come to Gotham City to do a story on Batman. Early in her career, her photos of the revolution in Corto Maltese were featured in Time Magazine. She soon becomes romantically involved with Bruce Wayne (Michael Keaton), unaware that he and Batman are the same person. In the casino scene in Wayne Manor, Vicki asks him what he does for a living, and he is about to answer, but is interrupted by Alfred. She later becomes drawn into the conflict with the Joker (Jack Nicholson) when he becomes obsessed with her. The Joker later attacks her while she meets with Wayne. Believing Wayne to be harmless, Joker taunts him with his signature line and shoots him. Wayne had been wearing body armor, however, and survives; he also recognizes Jack Napier as his parents' killer. When Vicki becomes suspicious of Bruce's actions, she asks her co-worker at the Gotham Globe, Alexander Knox (Robert Wuhl) to show footage of the alley where Bruce's parents were killed.

Eventually Vicki does learn Bruce's secret identity and is present during Batman's final confrontation with Joker on top of Gotham City Cathedral's belfry. This comes after the Joker nearly massacres Gotham City during a bicentennial celebration and kidnaps Vicki to draw Batman out. After telling Batman that they "made each other", the Joker attempts to escape via helicopter, but Batman ties a grappling hook around his leg and attaches it to a stone gargoyle, causing the Joker to fall to his death when the statue breaks loose of its moorings. At the end of the film, Alfred Pennyworth (Michael Gough) chauffeurs her to Wayne Manor to await Bruce's return once the night's crime fighting is done.

In an early script of the 1992 sequel Batman Returns, written by Sam Hamm, Vicki was supposed to return again as Bruce's love interest. However, the script was finally scrapped and Vicki didn't appear in the film, but is mentioned once during a conversation between Bruce Wayne and Selina Kyle (Michelle Pfeiffer), where Bruce mentions that Vicki ended their relationship because she ultimately could not accept his dual life (which prompts Selina to begin a relationship with Bruce there and then). She is also mentioned flippantly when Bruce reminds Alfred of his letting her into the Batcave in the first film, a reference to the scene's widely negative fan reaction. Vicki was not mentioned in subsequent sequels, which did not star Michael Keaton nor have Tim Burton as director.

Background
In the original script for Batman, written by Tom Mankiewicz, Silver St. Cloud was Bruce Wayne's love interest but working for crime boss Rupert Thorne. Director Tim Burton approached Sam Hamm, a comic book fan, to rewrite the screenplay. Hamm decided not to use an origin story, feeling that flashbacks would be more suitable and that "unlocking the mystery" would become part of the storyline. He reasoned, "You totally destroy your credibility if you show the literal process by which Bruce Wayne becomes Batman." Hamm replaced Silver St. Cloud with Vicki Vale and Rupert Thorne with his own creation, Carl Grissom. He completed his script in October 1986.

Sean Young was originally cast as Vicki Vale, but was injured in a horse-riding accident prior to commencement of filming. Young's departure necessitated an urgent search for an actress who, besides being right for the part, could commit to the film at very short notice. Michelle Pfeiffer was considered for the role, but was not cast due to Keaton's objections, as Keaton had previously been in a relationship with Pfeiffer. Peters suggested Kim Basinger: she was able to join the production immediately and was cast.

According to Basinger, she remembered just getting a call saying how quickly could she get over to London. She was immediately awestruck by the design and scope of Gotham City. Basinger said that she brought her own creative vision to the character of Vicki Vale and how she would fit into Gotham despite arriving with the film already in full production. According to her, she wanted Vicki Vale be tough in the newsroom, but also wanted her to be feminine like Cinderella.

Basinger said that she also put a lot of thought into Vicki Vale's wardrobe, in particular, having a white dress flown over on the Concorde. According to Basinger, she wanted her character to be all in white because symbolically, the film was about light in a dark world. Basinger understood that Vicki's ultimate purpose was to serve the love story of Bruce Wayne, trying to pull him toward a normal life. She also knew that she had to be a damsel in distress at the end of the day.

Michael Keaton used his comedic experience for scenes such as Bruce and Vicki's Wayne Manor dinner. He called himself a "logic freak" and was concerned that Batman's secret identity would in reality be fairly easy to uncover. Keaton discussed ideas with Burton to better disguise the character, including the use of contact lenses. Ultimately, Keaton decided to perform Batman's voice at a lower register than when he was portraying Bruce Wayne, which became a hallmark of the film version of the character, with Christian Bale later using the same technique.

Originally in the climax, the Joker was to kill Vicki Vale, sending Batman into a vengeful fury. Jon Peters reworked the climax without telling Burton and commissioned production designer Anton Furst to create a  model of the cathedral. This cost $100,000 when the film was already well over budget. Burton disliked the idea, having no clue how the scene would end: "Here were Jack Nicholson and Kim Basinger walking up this cathedral, and halfway up Jack turns around and says, 'Why am I walking up all these stairs? Where am I going?' 'We'll talk about it when you get to the top!' I had to tell him that I didn't know."

Tim Burton biographer Ken Hanke said: "Had the filmmakers made Vicki Vale a femme fatale rather than a damsel in distress, this could have made Batman as a homage and tribute to classic film noir." Portions of the climax pay homage to Vertigo (1958).

Writer Sam Hamm said it was Tim Burton's idea to have the Joker murder Wayne's parents. "The Writer's Strike was going on, and Tim had the other writers do that. I also hold innocent to Alfred letting Vicki Vale into the Batcave. Fans were ticked off with that, and I agree. That would have been Alfred's last day of employment at Wayne Manor," Hamm said.

Kim Basinger had romantic relationships with hairdresser/producer Jon Peters as well as singer Prince, who did the album for Batman and also produced her unreleased 1989 album Hollywood Affair. Peters later claimed that he had an affair with Basinger, despite her being married at the time. Peters also claimed that Michael Keaton also had an eye for her and that she helped him write the third act.

Song Do-yeong dubbed for Kim Basinger for the Korea TV edition of Batman (KBS and SBS).

Reception
The Hollywood Reporter, in its original review, remarked that "the uniqueness and very soul of the film [...] is achieved through the beautifully defined and probing performances of Michael Keaton as Bruce Wayne and Kim Basinger as Vicki Vale".

Kim Basinger was nominated for a Saturn Award for Best Supporting Actress and a Kids' Choice Award for Favorite Movie Actress. Basinger lost both awards to Whoopi Goldberg and Lea Thompson respectively.

Legacy
With over US$400 million in box office totals, Batman became the highest-grossing film of Kim Basinger's career. 

The music video for Prince's song "Batdance" was directed by Albert Magnoli and choreographed by Barry Lather, and featured dancers costumed as multiple Batman, Joker and Vicki Vale characters. Prince appears as a costumed character in face paint known as "Gemini", with one side of his face representing the Joker (evil) and the other, Batman (good). The Batman and Jokers alternate dance sections, while Prince (as both himself and Gemini) sings. The video ends with Gemini hitting a detonator, exploding an electric chair (referenced in the song), and Prince (actually Michael Keaton's voice) saying "Stop" as the video abruptly ends. The video also features one Vicki Vale wearing a black dress with the words "All this and brains too", a reference to The Dark Knight Returns by Frank Miller, in which a female news presenter wears a top with the same slogan.

The 12-inch vinyl and CD Maxi versions of the single included two remixes of "Batdance" that were done by Mark Moore and William Orbit, "The Batmix" and "Vicki Vale Mix". "The Batmix" focuses on the chaotic "rock" section of "Batdance", and is supplemented with electronic distortion and sampling of voices, instruments, and larger excerpts of Prince's then-unreleased "Rave Un2 the Joy Fantastic". The "Vicki Vale Mix" is an extension of the middle part of "Batdance", which includes dialogue between Bruce Wayne and Vicki Vale. In addition to "200 Balloons", the CD Maxi single (9-21257-2) features both of these remixes.

A maxi single was released after the Prince single "Scandalous!" titled The Scandalous Sex Suite, which contained a three part 19 minute suite of the song "Scandalous", with the three parts named The Crime, The Passion, and The Rapture. Kim Basinger also appeared on the maxi single. The 1989 Batman feature film soundtrack album also includes a track titled "Vicki Waiting".

Vicki Vale was portrayed by Brooke Burns in "Very Late" (also known as "Hot Date"), one of the "Batman" OnStar commercials that mimicked the look of the 1989 film. In the commercial, Batman is fighting the Penguin and contacts Vicki via OnStar to tell her that he will be 'very late'.

In the NBC action-comedy series Chuck pilot episode, "Chuck Versus the Intersect", the main character's best friend Morgan Grimes is reminded of Kim Basinger's portrayal of Vicki Vale in the 1989 film when he meets the main female protagonist Sarah Walker.

The Warner Bros. Museum in Burbank, California has on display the green wrap dress that Kim Basinger wears in the scene in which the Joker and his minions deface exhibits in the Gotham City Art Museum before meeting Vicki Vale to the tune of Prince's "Partyman".

See also
Bruce Wayne (1989 film series character)
Joker (Jack Napier)

References

External links

Fictional photographers
Batman live-action film characters
Batman (1989 film series)
Fictional reporters
Film characters introduced in 1989
Characters created by Tim Burton
Female characters in film